OK Jaanu is a 2017 Telugu romantic-comedy television series directed by Jai RV and starring Siddardh Varma Adduri and Krutika Singh Rathore. The serial is currently being aired on Star Maa from Monday to Saturday at 9:30 PM.

Plot
Jaanu, an affluent 19-year-old girl, has a family that would and can do anything to see her happy. She meets the hero, Ramu. He is from a middle-class family. Both run away from home and what happens next is interesting.

Cast

Main cast
 Siddardh Varma Adduri as Ramu
 Krutika Singh Rathore as Janaki (Jaanu)

Recurring cast
 Priya as Janaki (Jaanu's mother [deceased])/Gautami (Jaanu's stepmother) (dual/twin role)
 Sri Lakshmi as Ramu's maternal grandmother 
 Latha
 Roopa Devi

References

External links
 
 

Telugu-language television shows
Indian comedy television series
Indian television sitcoms
Indian television series
Indian television soap operas
Serial drama television series
Indian romance television series
2017 Indian television series debuts
Star Maa original programming